Marin Vegar (born 22 January 1990) is a Bosnian handball player for RK Eurofarm Rabotnik and the Bosnian national team.

He represented Bosnia and Herzegovina at the 2020 European Men's Handball Championship.

References

1990 births
Living people
Bosnia and Herzegovina male handball players
People from Čapljina
Expatriate handball players
Bosnia and Herzegovina expatriate sportspeople in Croatia
Bosnia and Herzegovina expatriate sportspeople in North Macedonia
Bosnia and Herzegovina expatriate sportspeople in Romania
CSA Steaua București (handball) players